Sidney Patrick Crosby  (born August 7, 1987) is a Canadian professional ice hockey centre and captain of the Pittsburgh Penguins of the National Hockey League (NHL). Nicknamed "Sid the Kid" and dubbed "The Next One", he was selected first overall by the Penguins in the 2005 NHL Entry Draft. Born and raised in Halifax, Crosby was considered one of the most lauded prospects in ice hockey history and is widely regarded as one of the greatest ice hockey players of all time.

During his two-year major junior career with the Rimouski Océanic, he earned many awards and led his club to the 2005 Memorial Cup final. Océanic and the Quebec Major Junior Hockey League retired Crosby's jersey number 87 in 2019. Crosby debuted in the NHL during the 2005–06 season, recording 102 points and finishing as runner-up for the Calder Memorial Trophy as the NHL Rookie of the Year. At 18 years and 253 days, he is the youngest player to date to reach 100 points in an NHL season. By his second season, he led the NHL with 120 points to capture the Art Ross Trophy, becoming the youngest player and the only teenager to win a scoring title in any major North American sports league. That same season, Crosby won the Hart Memorial Trophy as the league's most valuable player (MVP) and the Lester B. Pearson Award for most outstanding player as judged by his peers. He started the 2007–08 season with the team's captaincy and subsequently led them to the 2008 Stanley Cup Finals, where they were defeated by the Detroit Red Wings in six games. The Penguins returned to the Finals against Detroit the following year and won in seven games; Crosby became the youngest captain in NHL history to win the Stanley Cup.

In 2009–10, he received the Mark Messier Leadership Award and scored 51 goals, winning the Maurice Richard Trophy as the NHL's leading goal scorer. In early 2011, Crosby sustained a concussion that left him sidelined for the rest of the season and for most of the 2011–12 campaign. In 2014, Crosby again won the Hart Memorial Trophy as well as his second Art Ross Trophy (104 points) and his third Ted Lindsay Award. Crosby led Pittsburgh to Stanley Cup championships in 2016 and 2017, becoming the third player to win the Conn Smythe Trophy (playoff MVP) in consecutive years. In 2017, he won his second Richard Trophy and was named one of the 100 Greatest NHL Players in history.

Internationally, Crosby has represented Canada on numerous occasions. He won gold at the 2005 World Junior Championships, and was later named to Team Canada for the 2010 Winter Olympics in Vancouver. Playing against the United States in the gold medal game, he scored the game-winning goal in overtime. Crosby captained Team Canada at the 2014 Winter Olympics, winning his second consecutive Olympic gold medal. A year later, he led his country to gold in the World Championship in Prague, thus becoming a member of the Triple Gold Club and the only player in the club to have captained all three winning teams. In 2016, Crosby captained Canada to gold in the World Cup of Hockey and was elected MVP by a unanimous vote.

Early life

Crosby was born in the Grace Maternity Hospital in Halifax, Nova Scotia on August 7, 1987 to Troy and Trina (née Forbes) Crosby. Crosby's jersey number (87) and 2007 contract signing ($8.7 million per year) reflect his birthdate (8/7/87). Crosby grew up in nearby Cole Harbour and has a younger sister named Taylor. His father Troy was a goaltender who played for the Verdun Junior Canadiens in the Quebec Major Junior Hockey League (QMJHL). He helped the team win the 1985 President's Cup which lead them to the 1985 Memorial Cup. Troy was drafted 240th overall by the Montreal Canadiens in 1984, but never played at the NHL level. Growing up, Crosby admired Steve Yzerman and, like his father, was a Canadiens fan. Crosby began playing hockey by himself in his basement at the age of two, shooting pucks in a net that had the family dryer behind it, leading to a longstanding misconception that he was actually practising with the dryer; he learned to skate at age three.

From age 12 to 15, Crosby attended Astral Drive Junior High School. He was a straight-A student and, according to the vice-principal, "an amazing role model, who was really kind to students in the learning centre and to special needs kids". At age 15, Crosby transferred to Shattuck-Saint Mary's in Faribault, Minnesota to play with the school's hockey program. While playing for the Rimouski Océanic of the QMJHL, Crosby went to Harrison Trimble High School in Moncton, New Brunswick, where he graduated in 2005.

Playing career

Minor hockey
Early in his minor hockey years, Crosby began attracting media attention for his play and gave his first newspaper interview at age seven. When Crosby was 13, Nova Scotia's Minor Hockey Council refused to allow him to play midget, a level of minor hockey designated for 15- to 17-year-olds. His family sued but lost. The following year, he entered the midget level with the triple-A Dartmouth Subways and went on to score a combined 217 regular season and playoff points, leading Dartmouth to a second-place finish at the 2002 Air Canada Cup. He was named the MVP and Top Scorer awards at the national tournament at the tournament banquet held after the preliminary round and he finished the tournament with 24 points (11 goals and 13 assists) in 7 games. Crosby was called up as a 14-year-old to play two games with the Maritime Junior A Hockey League's Truro Bearcats that season. Crosby had been drafted by the Bearcats in the 2001 MJAHL Draft as a 13-year-old.

During his midget season, Crosby appeared on the CBC's Hockey Day in Canada telecast. He has recalled numerous instances in which opposing players intentionally attempted to injure him, as well as constant verbal abuse from parents on and off the ice. Parents taunted and threatened Crosby so harshly, he took to not wearing his jersey between tournament games while he waited to play so that he would not be recognized. Due to this treatment, he elected to play for the American hockey program at Shattuck-Saint Mary's Boarding School, Minnesota for the 2002–03 hockey season. In 57 games with the Sabres, he recorded 72 goals and 162 points, leading the team to a U18 AAA national championship.

Junior career

Rimouski Océanic (2003–2005)
Crosby was selected first overall in the 2003 Midget Draft by the Rimouski Océanic of the Quebec Major Junior Hockey League (QMJHL). In his first exhibition game, he scored eight points, leading his teammates to nickname him "Darryl" (in reference to Darryl Sittler's ten-point NHL game in 1976). In his first regular season game in the QMJHL, he scored one goal and added two assists. He was named QMJHL Player of the Week for two consecutive weeks at the start of the season and won the honour four more times as the season progressed. He was named QMJHL Player of the Month and Canadian Hockey League (CHL) Player of the Week three times each. Crosby finished his rookie QMJHL season with 54 goals and 81 assists over 59 games to capture the Jean Béliveau Trophy as the league's leading point-scorer. He was further recognized with the RDS/JVC Trophy (overall rookie of the year) and Michel Brière Memorial Trophy (most valuable player), becoming the first QMJHL player to win all three major awards at once. Rounding out Crosby's accolades for the 2003–04 regular season were QMJHL All-Rookie and first All-Star team honours, as well as Offensive Rookie, Offensive Player and Personality of the Year Awards. As a team, the Océanic led the Eastern Division with 34 wins and 76 points. After receiving a first-round bye in the 2003 QMJHL playoffs, they defeated the Shawinigan Cataractes in the quarterfinals, then were eliminated by the Moncton Wildcats in the semi-finals. Crosby recorded 16 points (7 goals and 9 assists) over 9 playoff games.

During the off-season, the World Hockey Association, a major professional league proposed to rival the NHL, held an Entry Draft on July 17, 2004. Holding the first overall selection, Toronto chose Crosby. The following month, it was reported that Crosby turned down a US$7.5 million contract over three years to play for Hamilton. Crosby told reporters that while "it took a lot to say no to that much money", he "work[ed] hard most of his life to play in the NHL". The contract would have paid him $2.5 million annually and an additional $2 million payout regardless of whether the WHA was realized as a legitimate league or not. However, it was not clarified how Hamilton could have signed Crosby, as Toronto held his WHA playing rights. Nevertheless, the WHA never materialized.

Returning to the Océanic for the 2004–05 season, Crosby continued dominating the league, leading the league with 66 goals, 102 assists and 168 points over 62 games to capture his second consecutive Beliveau Trophy. Joining Crosby on Rimouski's top line were wingers Dany Roussin and Marc-Antoine Pouliot, who finished second and third in league-scoring with 116 and 114 points respectively. In addition to his scoring title, Crosby was once again awarded Most Valuable Player, Offensive Player and Personality of the Year, while repeating as a QMJHL First All-Star. The Océanic finished the regular season with the best record in the league, registering 45 wins and 98 points, including a league record-setting 28-game undefeated streak. They went on to capture the President's Cup as QMJHL playoff champions, defeating the Halifax Mooseheads in the finals. Crosby led the playoffs with 31 points (14 goals and 17 assists) over 13 games, earning him the Guy Lafleur Trophy as post-season MVP. With their QMJHL championship, the Océanic qualified for the 2005 Memorial Cup, Canada's national major junior tournament. Meeting the London Knights in the final, the Océanic were shut-out 4–0. Despite the loss, Crosby was named to the Tournament All-Star team and captured the Ed Chynoweth Trophy as the competition's leading scorer with 11 points (6 goals and 5 assists) over 5 games. Knights forward Corey Perry was awarded the Stafford Smythe Memorial Trophy as the MVP. Soon after, he attended the NHL prospect combine in preparation for the 2005 NHL Entry Draft.

Rimouski Océanic retired jersey number 87 in Crosby's honor in 2019, and the QMJHL also retired the number for all of its teams.

Pittsburgh Penguins (2005–present)

Rise to superstardom (2005–2007)

Entering the 2005 NHL Entry Draft, Crosby was listed first overall in the NHL Central Scouting Bureau and International Scouting Services' respective rankings of prospects. He also won the Mike Bossy Trophy as the QMJHL's best prospect. Crosby was selected first overall in the draft by the Pittsburgh Penguins on July 30, 2005. Due to the labour lockout that suspended the entire 2004–05 NHL season, positioning for the 2005 draft was conducted via a weighted lottery based on each team's playoff appearances and draft lottery victories in the last four years. This lottery system led to the draft being popularly referred to as the "Sidney Crosby Lottery" or the "Sidney Crosby Sweepstakes".

"Sid the Kid", a nickname given to him by the media early in his career, made his NHL debut on October 5, 2005 against the New Jersey Devils, and registered an assist on the team's first goal of the season, scored by Mark Recchi in a 5–1 loss. He scored his first NHL goal in the Penguins' home opener on October 8 against goaltender Hannu Toivonen of the Boston Bruins. Despite having registered two assists for a three-point night, the Penguins were defeated 7–6 in overtime. Crosby began his rookie season playing alongside Hall of Famer Mario Lemieux. Unfortunately, Lemieux was forced to retire due to an irregular heartbeat after having played just 26 games of the season. Near the midway point of the season, Penguins head coach Ed Olczyk was fired and replaced by Michel Therrien on December 15, 2005. The following day, Therrien designated Crosby as an alternate captain for the Penguins. The move drew criticism from some hockey pundits, including Don Cherry, who claimed that Crosby did not have the experience for the position. Cherry said, "An 18-year-old kid says he's going to give us ideas. What, from the Quebec League, he's going to give them ideas? Come on. That's ridiculous." Although hopes were high in Pittsburgh for the club to succeed, largely in part to the beginning of Crosby's NHL career and bolstered by the acquisitions of Sergei Gonchar, Žigmund Pálffy, and Mark Recchi, the Penguins still finished with the worst record in the Eastern Conference.

Nevertheless, Crosby's first NHL campaign was a personal success as he established franchise records in assists (63) and points (102) for a rookie, both of which were previously held by Mario Lemieux. He also became the youngest player in NHL history to score 100 points in a single season, and only the seventh rookie ever to hit the benchmark. Overall, Crosby finished sixth in the NHL scoring race and seventh in the NHL in assists. Among Canadian NHL players, he trailed only Joe Thornton and Dany Heatley. Throughout the season, Crosby had battled with Washington Capitals forward and 2004 first-overall pick Alexander Ovechkin for the rookie scoring lead. He finished second to Ovechkin's 106 points and also lost to the Capitals forward for the Calder Memorial Trophy as NHL rookie of the year. It marked the start of a rivalry that would help "define the league" for over a decade. Throughout his first season, Crosby was accused by opposing players and coaches of taking dives and complaining to officials, which was typically attributed to his youth. He became the first rookie to earn 100 penalty minutes and 100 points in the same season, which magnified his reputation for complaining to NHL officials. Hockey analyst Kelly Hrudey compared Crosby to Wayne Gretzky, who had a similar reputation as a "whiner" in his youth, and suggested that as Crosby matured, he would mellow out and his reputation would fade.

In his second NHL season, Crosby built on his rookie success. On October 28, 2006, Crosby scored his first NHL hat-trick in an 8–2 victory over the Philadelphia Flyers. His success against the Flyers continued as just over six weeks later, on December 13, he recorded the first six-point game of his career (one goal and five assists). The multi-point effort vaulted Crosby into the NHL scoring lead, which he would retain for the remainder of the season. He finished the 2006–07 with 36 goals and 84 assists in 79 games to become the first teenager to lead the NHL in scoring since Wayne Gretzky in 1980. Being only 19 years old at the time, he became the youngest player in NHL history to win the Art Ross Trophy and the youngest scoring champion in any major North American professional sport.

Crosby's second NHL season also saw significant improvements for the Penguins franchise as a whole, as the emergence of Calder Trophy-winner Evgeni Malkin and runner-up Jordan Staal complemented the club's offence. As a result, the Penguins jumped from last place in the Eastern Conference the previous season to fifth for the club's first playoff appearance since 2001. Playing the Ottawa Senators in the opening round, Crosby scored a goal in his Stanley Cup playoff debut in a 6–3 loss. He finished the series with five points in five games as the Penguins were ousted by the eventual Stanley Cup runner-up. Following the Penguins defeat, Crosby was named Pittsburgh's team captain on May 31, 2007, making him (at 19 years, 9 months, and 24 days) the youngest team captain in NHL history. During the season, the Penguins offered him the captaincy, but he turned it down. In the press conference naming him the team captain, he explained:
"I just thought it wasn't right for me. As a team, we were playing great and you don't want to disrupt things like that. Individually, I was not ready to accept that responsibility quite yet. Going through the playoffs and having that experience has probably given me more confidence. I understand there is going to be a lot more responsibility on my shoulders with this, but it's something I'm ready for, I feel very comfortable with it and I'm just excited to get things going."

At the NHL's annual awards show later in June 2007, Crosby completed a rare off-season "hat-trick", winning the Hart Memorial Trophy and the Lester B. Pearson Award in addition to his previously-clinched Art Ross Trophy. He became the youngest player in NHL history to win the Lester B. Pearson, and only the second youngest player ever to win the Hart (after Gretzky). He became the youngest player ever to be named to the NHL's first All-Star team.

Runner–up and first Stanley Cup title (2007–2009)

With Crosby's initial three-year, entry-level contract set to expire at the end of the following season, the Penguins signed him to a five-year, $43.5 million contract extension on July 10, 2007, ensuring his stay with the Penguins through the 2012–13 season. Midway through the subsequent season, Crosby recorded a Gordie Howe hat-trick on December 20, 2007 in a game against the Boston Bruins. His first assist came 55 seconds into the first period. At 8:26 of the same period, Crosby scored to give the Penguins a 2–0 lead. Then, five minutes and nine seconds into the second frame, Crosby fought ex-Penguin defenceman Andrew Ference to complete the hat-trick. This was Crosby's first NHL fight. In the NHL's first Winter Classic (with a record crowd of 71,217 fans in attendance), Crosby scored the shootout winner in heavy snowfall to defeat the Buffalo Sabres. However, two weeks later, on January 18, 2008, Crosby suffered a high ankle sprain crashing leg-first into the boards in a game against the Tampa Bay Lightning. As a result, he missed the 2008 All-Star Game, to which he was named a starter. After missing 21 games, he returned on March 4 against the Lightning and earned an assist. However, two games after his return, he felt his ankle was not up to shape and decided that he needed more time for it to heal. Crosby consequently sat out of the Penguins' next seven games and returned on March 27, 2008 to help the Penguins defeat the New York Islanders 3–1. Despite his injury-shortened campaign, Crosby still managed 72 points in just 53 games.

Crosby's absence from the Penguins' line-up served as a stepping stone for teammate Evgeni Malkin, who, now in his second season, was developing into a superstar in his own right. Picking up the offensive slack, Malkin finished second in league scoring to Alexander Ovechkin and was also a Hart Memorial Trophy nominee as MVP honours also went to Ovechkin. In addition to Crosby's return to the line-up late in the regular season, the Penguins acquired star winger Marián Hossa from the Atlanta Thrashers at the trade deadline, placing the club in a strong position to make a deep playoff run. Pittsburgh finished the regular season as Atlantic Division champions and just two points shy of the first-seeded Montreal Canadiens. In a rematch of the previous year's opening round, the Penguins began the 2008 playoffs facing the Ottawa Senators, whom they quickly swept in four games. After then defeating the New York Rangers and archrival Philadelphia Flyers, each in five games, the Penguins reached the final round for the first time since 1992, to face the Detroit Red Wings. After being shut-out as a team for the first two games of the series, Crosby scored the first two goals of game three as the series shifted to Pittsburgh to fuel a 3–2 win. The Penguins lost the next game and despite staving off defeat in game five, they were overcome by the Red Wings in six games. Crosby finished the playoffs with 27 points (6 goals and 21 assists in 20 games), tying Conn Smythe-winner Henrik Zetterberg (13 goals and 14 assists in 22 games) for the playoff scoring lead.

Early in the following season, on October 18, 2008, Crosby scored one goal and three assists to surpass benchmarks of 100 goals, 200 assists, and 300 points for his career. On the play in which Crosby scored, teammate Evgeni Malkin assisted to record his own 200th point. As a result, Crosby had a team trainer cut the puck in half so both players could commemorate the achievement. Minor injury troubles kept Crosby from five games early in the season as he was listed day-to-day, but he was, for the most part, able to bounce back from the previous injury-riddled season and stay healthy. He recorded 33 goals and 70 assists to finish third in league scoring, as Evgeni Malkin captured his first career Art Ross Trophy. Entering the 2009 playoffs as the defending Prince of Wales Trophy winners, the Penguins defeated the Philadelphia Flyers in the opening round before meeting the Washington Capitals for a highly publicized second-round matchup. The series was heavily followed as it pitted Ovechkin of the Capitals against both Crosby and Malkin, who together finished as the league's top three scorers that season. In the second game, Crosby and Ovechkin recorded matching three-goal efforts for their first career playoff hat tricks in a 4–3 Capitals victory. Despite being down 2–0 in the series, Crosby and the Penguins won the next three games and eventually defeated the Capitals in a seventh and deciding game, in which Crosby added another two goals. Following a sweep of the Carolina Hurricanes in the Eastern Conference Final, Crosby opted against recent NHL tradition and picked up the Prince of Wales Trophy, which he had left untouched the previous year. In explanation of the change of heart, Crosby said, "We didn't touch the trophy last year, and obviously we didn't have the result we wanted ... Although we haven't accomplished exactly what we want ... we can still enjoy it."

The Penguins met the Detroit Red Wings for the second straight year in the Finals, and this time Crosby won his first Stanley Cup title in seven games. At 21 years, 10 months, and 5 days, Crosby became the youngest NHL captain to win the Stanley Cup since 1895. (The youngest captain to lead his team to the Stanley Cup in the history of the trophy is Mike Grant of the 1895 Montreal Victorias, who was 21 years and 2 months at the time.) In the deciding Game 7, Crosby was forced to watch all but 32 seconds of the third period from the bench after suffering a knee injury less than halfway through the second period due to a hit from Johan Franzén. Following the game, Crosby was criticized by Detroit forward Kris Draper for neglecting to shake hands with some of Detroit's players, most notably captain Nicklas Lidström. An irate Draper was quoted as saying, "Nick was waiting and waiting, and Crosby didn't come over to shake his hand. That's ridiculous, especially as their captain." Crosby replied afterward, saying, "I just won the Stanley Cup. I think I have the right to celebrate with my teammates. I know it's not easy waiting around... I understand if they don't feel like waiting around. But you know what? It's the easiest thing to do in the world, to shake hands after you win. I had no intentions of trying to skip guys and not shake their hands. I think that was a pretty unreasonable comment."

Injury–plagued years (2010–2012)
In the 2009–10 NHL season, Crosby tied Tampa Bay Lightning centre Steven Stamkos for the lead in goals scored, with 51 goals, earning the Rocket Richard Trophy. He also garnered 58 assists for a total of 109 points, enough to tie with Alexander Ovechkin for second in league points, trailing only the Vancouver Canucks' Henrik Sedin's 112. Crosby was also named a finalist for the Hart Memorial Trophy and Ted Lindsay Award. Crosby won the Mark Messier Leadership Award, getting recognized as a "superior leader within the sport, setting a positive example through on-ice performance, motivation of team members and a dedication to the community". This was the second time he had received this honour, the other being in January 2007, during the award's first year when it was presented monthly. He was also included on NHL's all-decade second team of 2000s.

Crosby's Penguins were defeated in the second round of the 2010 Stanley Cup playoffs, losing to the Montreal Canadiens in seven games. Crosby had 19 points in 13 games in the playoffs, though through seven games against the Canadiens, he had only one goal and four assists. Game 7 was also the last game to be played at Mellon Arena, the Penguins' home rink since the start of the franchise. On July 27, 2010, Crosby joined his mentor Mario Lemieux to be the first to skate on the new ice at the Consol Energy Center. The two skated for about five minutes before being joined on the ice by a group of young hockey fans all wearing Lemieux's 66 or Crosby's 87 jerseys.

In the 2010–11 season, Crosby had a 25-game point streak, which began on November 5, 2010 against the Anaheim Ducks and ended on December 28, 2010 against the New York Islanders. During this streak, he had 27 goals (including three hat-tricks) and 24 assists for 51 points. This streak was tied for 11th-longest point streak in NHL history, and he was named First Star of the Month in both November and December. On January 3, 2011, Crosby was selected as a 2011 All-Star, along with teammates Evgeni Malkin, Marc-André Fleury and Kris Letang. However, neither Crosby nor Malkin were available to play in the All-Star Game due to injuries, and rookie Jeff Skinner (along with Paul Stastny) were named as replacements. In consecutive games – the 2011 NHL Winter Classic on January 1, 2011, against the Washington Capitals and then January 5 against the Tampa Bay Lightning – Crosby suffered hits to his head from Dave Steckel and Victor Hedman respectively. After experiencing several concussion symptoms, Crosby did not return for the rest of the regular season, and he missed the 2011 playoffs. The Penguins were further crippled when Evgeni Malkin suffered a torn ACL and MCL, taking him out for the rest of the season and leaving the Penguins without their two highest-scoring players. Despite Crosby's injury and subsequent absence for the final 41 games of the season, he finished as the Penguins' leading scorer. His 66 points in 41 games were 16 points ahead of the second-highest team scorer, defenceman Kris Letang. In so doing, Crosby set an NHL record for fewest games played by an NHL team's points leader.

Crosby missed the first 20 games of the 2011–12 season due to the lingering effects of his concussion or possibly multiple concussions. He returned on November 21, 2011 in a game against the New York Islanders, scoring two goals and two assists in a 5–0 shutout for the Penguins. However, after playing another seven games – scoring a total of 12 points in 8 games – Crosby's concussion-like symptoms returned in December 2011, possibly following an elbow hit by David Krejčí in his eighth game of the season. Despite passing a successful ImPACT test, Crosby decided not to return on the ice until he felt perfectly fine, stating that he also must "listen to [his] body". Crosby returned to action on March 15, 2012, scoring an assist in a 5–2 win against the New York Rangers. Despite only playing 22 games, Crosby recorded 29 assists to go with 8 goals for 37 points, including his 600th career point. He later credited neurologists at UPMC and chiropractic neurologist Ted Carrick with helping him return to hockey.

Crosby's return in advance of the playoffs resulted in many experts predicting that the Penguins would win their second Stanley Cup title in four years, and though the Penguins were accordingly picked to oust the Philadelphia Flyers in their first-round series, it was acknowledged that it would be a tough series for both teams. The Flyers shocked the Penguins by winning the first three consecutive games, the third of which saw the teams combine for 158 penalty minutes. After the 8–4 loss in Game 3, Crosby was widely criticized for his conduct during the game, and for his testy post-game interview. When asked about an incident where Flyer forward Jakub Voráček had dropped his glove and Crosby swatted it away with his stick before Voráček could pick it up, Crosby replied, saying, "I don't like any guy on their team there, so his glove was near me, went to pick it up, and I pushed it, so yeah, that's... [...] I don't like them. Because I don't like them. I don't like... I don't like any guy on their team." When the interviewer suggested that he could have skated away, Crosby replied, "Skate away? Yeah, well, I didn't that time." The Penguins went on to win the next two games, but ultimately lost the series in Game 6. Crosby would finish with three goals and five assists in the six games. On June 28, 2012, the Penguins announced that Crosby agreed to a 12-year, $104.4 million contract extension set to keep Crosby in Pittsburgh through to the end of the 2024–25 NHL season.

Individual awards and playoff disappointments (2012–2015)

The start of the 2012–13 was postponed until January 2013 due to the owners locking out the players as negotiations took place to solidify a new collective agreement for the players. During this time, Crosby was a regular attendee of meetings taking place between National Hockey League Players' Association (NHLPA) representatives and NHL owners. The lock-out began on September 15, 2012 and ended on January 6, 2013 with the NHL regular season beginning on January 19. During the 119-day lock-out, Crosby was often questioned about his future plans should the lockout persist, and said on more than one occasion that he was considering contract offers from various teams in European leagues (where many NHL players went so that they could continue playing in a professional capacity while waiting for the lock-out to end or for the NHL season to be officially cancelled). Crosby continued to practice and participated with other NHL players who did not go overseas in several exhibition games open to the public.

With the season finally underway in late January, Crosby set the pace for scoring, totalling 31 points (9 goals and 22 assists) through the first 21 games. He remained hot through March, scoring another 25 points (6 goals and 19 assists) in 15 games as the Penguins went unbeaten over this stretch. However, his regular season came to an abrupt end on March 30 in a home game against the New York Islanders. Crosby's teammate Brooks Orpik unleashed a slapshot which caught Crosby in the mouth, causing the centreman to lose several teeth. Crosby was down on the ice for several minutes before the medical staff was able to help him to the dressing room with Crosby holding a towel over his face. Initially, the prognosis was not severe, but it was discovered a short while later that Crosby had broken his jaw and would require several rounds of reconstructive dental surgery. He missed the final 12 games of the regular season and finished fourth in the scoring race, losing the title to Tampa Bay's Martin St. Louis by four points.

Crosby returned to the ice May 5 for the Penguins' second game against their first-round playoff opponents, the New York Islanders, ironically, the team Pittsburgh had been playing when Crosby was injured. Despite two goals from Crosby, Pittsburgh lost the game 3–2, tying the series at one game apiece. The Penguins would ultimately prevail 4–2 in the series over the Isles with Crosby scoring nine points (three goals and six assists) in the five games in which he played. Crosby and the Penguins moved on to face the Ottawa Senators in the second round, with Crosby scoring a hat-trick in Game 2 of the series. Pittsburgh quickly defeated Ottawa four games to one in the series with a still-hot Crosby finishing the series with four goals and two assists. The Eastern Conference Finals came down to what many felt were the two best teams in the conference: Pittsburgh and Boston. Bruins goaltender Tuukka Rask put on an outstanding performance, shutting down Pittsburgh's potent offence with the help of a stifling defensive effort from his teammates. The Penguins were held to just two goals in the series, with Rask stopping 134 of 136 shots on goal (.985%). Crosby, who was strong for the Penguins in the regular season and through the first two rounds of the playoffs was held off the score sheet entirely, finishing the series with no goals and no assists on 13 shots. The Bruins swept the Penguins in four-straight games, ending Crosby's bid for a second Stanley Cup championship. In the off-season, Crosby was awarded his second Ted Lindsay Award and finished as runner-up to the Hart Memorial Trophy and Bill Masterton Memorial Trophy.

Crosby put together a healthy and productive campaign in 2013–14, playing 80 games for the first time since the 2009–10 season. Crosby finished the season with 36 goals and a league-leading 68 assists, marking the first time in his career that he led the league in assists. He also finished with a league-high 104 points, winning the Art Ross Trophy for the second time in his career. He also went on to win the Hart Memorial Trophy and the Ted Lindsay Award. Finishing first overall in the Metropolitan Division, the Penguins were matched-up with a new division rival, the Columbus Blue Jackets, in the first round of the 2014 playoffs. Despite a very back-and-forth series and not a single goal by Crosby, the Penguins defeated the Jackets in six games to advance to a second-round matchup with the New York Rangers. Going into their second-round series with the Rangers, Crosby looked to end a long playoff goal drought, which dated back to the 2013 Conference Finals against the Boston Bruins. After dropping Game 1 at home, Crosby broke his goal drought in Game 2 as the Pens tied the series at 1–1 heading back to Madison Square Garden. The Penguins would capitalize on their Game 2 win, taking the next two games and eliminating the Rangers home-ice advantage. However, the Rangers would quickly rebound, winning Game 5, 6 and 7, sending the Penguins home without a prize for the fifth straight season. The team's collapse prompted Penguins ownership to fire general manager Ray Shero, replacing him with Jim Rutherford, the former general manager of the Carolina Hurricanes. Rutherford's first action as GM was to fire Dan Bylsma as head coach, and on June 25, he announced that Mike Johnston was the new head coach.

Crosby finished the 2014–15 season with the highest point-per-game average and a total of 84 points, trailing only John Tavares (86 points) and Art Ross winner Jamie Benn (87 points). On November 26, 2014, Crosby scored his 800th career point, becoming the sixth-fastest player in NHL history to reach that milestone. On January 4, 2015, in a game against Philadelphia, Crosby scored his 300th career NHL goal. Despite a strong start to the season, the injury-plagued Penguins entered the playoffs as the Eastern Conference's second wild card. Facing the New York Rangers, Crosby helped even the series with two goals in Game 2. Despite this, the Penguins were defeated in five games and was eliminated in the first round for the first time since the 2012 playoffs.

Back-to-back Stanley Cup titles (2015–2017)
Starting the 2015–16 season, the Penguins went through a major overhaul of their roster, adding a number of offensive players such as right winger Phil Kessel. Despite a line-up laced with some of the world's finest offensive talents, Crosby struggled to score points, as he and the team had for much of the Johnston era. By the time Johnston was fired on December 12, 2015, after posting a 15–10–3 record through 28 games, some media outlets began speculating that Crosby had aged out of his prime scoring years. On December 16, The Washington Post wrote, "Sidney Crosby has widely been regarded as the NHL's best player since he burst on the scene as a rookie in 2005 ... But Crosby just hasn't been himself this season, scoring just six goals in 29 games and sitting with a plus/minus of minus-seven. All players go through slumps, but it is clear that the Crosby we knew has been on the decline for some time." His slow start was capped off by not being selected as a starter for the 2016 NHL All-Star Game.

However, under new head coach Mike Sullivan, the 28-year-old turned his season around, outscoring all NHL players from December 12 through the end of the season. On February 2, Crosby scored three-straight goals for his first natural hat-trick in more than five years. Four days later, Crosby scored his 900th, 901st and 902nd career NHL points to fuel a 3–2 overtime comeback victory over the Florida Panthers. He tallied at least 1 point in 15 of Pittsburgh's 16 games in March, including six multi-point efforts, and was subsequently named the NHL's First Star of the Month. On April 2, Crosby recorded his 600th NHL assist as the Penguins clinched their berth in the 2016 playoffs. Six days later, he scored in overtime against Washington Capitals to secure home-ice advantage in the first round of the playoffs. Crosby finished the season with 36 goals and 85 points in 80 games, including a career-high nine game-winning goals, and was voted team MVP for the sixth time in his career. His two-way game also received league-wide praise, with Hockey Hall of Fame coach Scotty Bowman stating that Crosby would be a good candidate for the Frank J. Selke Trophy as the league's best defensive forward. Crosby's comeback also impressed Wayne Gretzky, who said, "He had a tough start, but the sign of an elite athlete is a guy that battles through it. He didn't point any fingers, he just battled through it, and I don't think there is any question the last 40 or so games, he made a case for the MVP. He was that good. He went to another level." On May 7, Crosby was named a finalist for the Hart Memorial Trophy. He finished as the first runner-up with 800 points and 11 first-place votes.

After losing to New York in the past two playoffs, the Penguins eliminated the Rangers in the first round, winning four games to one, after losing to the Rangers by the same series margin in the first round the previous year. Crosby led the team in scoring with three goals and eight points. The Penguins then eliminated the Presidents' Trophy-winning Washington Capitals in six games, without much offensive production from either Crosby (two assists) or Malkin (one goal and one assist). Advancing to their first Conference Final since 2013, Crosby scored the overtime winner against the Tampa Bay Lightning in Game 2. The goal was scored 40 seconds into overtime for a 3–2 win, the fastest overtime goal in Penguins' playoff history, and the first of his career in the playoffs. In the following game, he scored the game-winning goal in a 4–2 victory. After dropping the next two games, Crosby scored his third game-winning goal of the series in Game 6, forcing a final game in Pittsburgh. Defeating the Tampa Bay Lightning 2–1 in Game 7, Crosby helped his team win the Eastern Conference championship, advancing to the Stanley Cup Final against the San Jose Sharks. In the series, the Penguins defeated the Sharks in six games to earn Crosby his second Stanley Cup title. He became the ninth player to win the Stanley Cup twice as well as two Olympic gold medals. Finishing the playoffs with 19 points (6 goals and 13 assists), including the primary helper on the Cup-winning goal scored by Kris Letang, Crosby was awarded the Conn Smythe Trophy as the MVP of the playoffs.

Crosby missed the first six games of the 2016–17 season after being diagnosed with a concussion just a few days before the season opener against the Washington Capitals. Upon his return, he scored 30 goals in his first 45 games, and on February 16, 2017, he registered an assist on a Chris Kunitz goal against the Winnipeg Jets to reach 1,000 NHL points, doing so in just his 757th game to become the 12th-fastest (and 11th-youngest) player to reach that milestone. He also participated in his first NHL All-Star Game since 2007, winning the shooting accuracy segment of the Skills Competition. He was named team MVP and finished the season as the runner up for the Art Ross Trophy with 44 goals and 89 points in 75 games. It marked the eighth time he finished a season in the top-three in NHL scoring, tying Mario Lemieux, Stan Mikita and Phil Esposito for the third-most instances in history behind only Wayne Gretzky (15 times) and Gordie Howe (12 times). With his 44 goals, Crosby captured the Rocket Richard Trophy for the second time in his career. Crosby was also named a finalist for the Hart Memorial Trophy and Ted Lindsay Award.

Entering the 2017 playoffs as the defending Stanley Cup champions, the Penguins defeated the Columbus Blue Jackets in five games before meeting the Washington Capitals in the second round. After winning the first two games on the road, Crosby sustained a concussion after suffering an injury from a slash and cross-check from Alexander Ovechkin and Matt Niskanen in Game 3. He missed Game 4 but returned to practice the next day and played in Game 5. The Penguins would eventually eliminate the Capitals in Game 7, with Crosby assisting on the series-winning goal. The Penguins then defeated the Ottawa Senators in a gruelling seven-game series to secure their second consecutive trip to the Stanley Cup Final. Crosby had the primary assist on the series-clinching goal, scored by Chris Kunitz in double overtime. Facing the Nashville Predators in the Finals, Pittsburgh jumped out to a two-game lead, despite being outplayed for long stretches in both games. The Predators responded by tying up the series, winning Game 3 and 4 at home. In Game 5, the Penguins' captain delivered a dominant performance, adding three assists in a 6–0 win to pass Lemieux for most Stanley Cup Final points (20) in franchise history. After defeating the Predators 2–0 in Game 6, the Penguins became the first team to repeat as Stanley Cup champions since the 1997–98 Detroit Red Wings, and the first to do so in the salary cap era. Crosby won his second consecutive Conn Smythe Trophy as the most valuable player of the playoffs, only the third player to do so after Bernie Parent (1974, 1975) and Mario Lemieux (1991, 1992). He finished second in scoring behind Evgeni Malkin with 27 points (8 goals and 19 assists) in 24 games.

Recent years (2017–present)
In the 2017–18 season, Crosby appeared in all 82 of Pittsburgh's regular season games for the first time in his career, finishing with 29 goals and 60 assists for 89 points. On February 12, 2018, he scored his 400th NHL goal, becoming the 95th player to reach the milestone. On March 21, he recorded his 700th career NHL assist. The Penguins began their 2018 playoff campaign against the Philadelphia Flyers. In Game 1 of the Battle of Pennsylvania, Crosby recorded a natural hat-trick in a 7–0 win. On April 18, in Game 4, Crosby passed Mario Lemieux as the Penguins' all-time playoff points leader with 173. The Penguins ultimately defeated the Flyers in six games, with Crosby scoring 6 goals and 13 points. After the series, retired Hockey Hall of Fame centre Bryan Trottier said of Crosby, "Sid has a wonderful gift to maintain his composure and not get rattled. You like the emotion he shows, too. I think he fires his team up, and that's why he's wearing the 'C' [for captain]." The Penguins were eventually eliminated in Game 6 of the second round by the eventual Stanley Cup champion Washington Capitals, ending Penguins's bid for a three-peat. Crosby finished with 21 points (9 goals and 12 assists) in 12 games, pushing his career playoff total to 185, tied with Steve Yzerman for tenth-most all-time.

On January 3, 2019, Crosby was selected to play in the NHL All-Star Game for the eighth time in his career. He scored four goals and four assists, helping the Metropolitan Division to victory; his efforts won him his first All-Star MVP award, making him the sixth in NHL history to have won that award after having won the Conn Smythe Trophy and Hart Memorial Trophy. During the 2018–19 season, Crosby passed Mario Lemieux to become the Penguins' all-time leader in games played (916), and moved into second place on the Pens' all-time scoring list with his 440th career goal in a 5–1 victory over the Montreal Canadiens on March 3, 2019. Two days later, he became the 48th player in NHL history to score at least 1,200 career points. He finished the season with 100 points (35 goals and 65 assists), the first time he has reached the 100-point mark since scoring 104 points in 2013–14. Crosby finished 4th in voting for the Selke Trophy and became a Hart Trophy finalist for the seventh time in his career. He was also elected team-MVP. Crosby was selected to the NHL All-Decade First Team in January 2020. The Penguins finished fifth in the Eastern Conference in the COVID-19-shortened 2019–20 season, facing the 12th-seeded Montreal Canadiens in the Eastern Conference qualifying round. The Canadiens upset the Penguins in four games, eliminating Pittsburgh on August 7, 2020, Crosby's 33rd birthday. 

In the shortened 2020–21 season, Crosby led the team in scoring with 62 points (24 goals and 38 assists), and was the recipient of the team's MVP Award and the Players' Player Award. He was also a finalist for the Ted Lindsay Award. On February 21, 2021, Crosby became the first player in Penguins history to play 1,000 games with the franchise. The team clinched a playoff berth for the 15th consecutive season under Crosby's captaincy, the longest active postseason streak among all teams in the North American professional sports leagues. However, the Penguins were eliminated in the first round of the playoffs by the New York Islanders for the second time in three seasons.

On February 15, 2022, Crosby scored his 500th career goal on a power play against the Philadelphia Flyers, becoming the 46th player to score that many goals in NHL history and the 18th to have scored them all for a single team. He was the second Penguin to score 500 goals, after Lemieux. Continuing to hit new milestones, in an April 10 game against the Nashville Predators he recorded a goal and an assist in regulation time, before scoring the overtime-winning goal, his 1400th point in the NHL. Crosby finished the season with 31 goals and 53 assists in 69 games played, while the Penguins were third in the Metropolitan Division. They advanced into the 2022 Stanley Cup playoffs to meet the New York Rangers. With both Evgeni Malkin and Kris Letang's contracts up in the summer, there was some question as to whether this would be the final outing for the core of the Penguins franchise in Crosby's era. In Game 3 of the series against the Rangers, Crosby recorded his 197th career playoff point, passing Paul Coffey for sixth place in all-time playoff point standings. Two days later, he managed a goal and two assists in the Penguins' 7–2 victory in Game 4, becoming the sixth player to record 200 career points in the playoffs. Midway through the second period of Game 5 in Madison Square Garden, with the Penguins up 2–0, Crosby took an elbow to the head from Rangers defenceman Jacob Trouba and exited the game. In his absence, the Rangers rallied to win 5–3 and stave off elimination, and Crosby's departure was widely cited as the game's turning point. Coach Mike Sullivan said that Crosby was being evaluated. After missing Game 6, Crosby returned for Game 7, alongside absent team goaltender Tristan Jarry and winger Rickard Rakell. However, the Penguins lost to the Rangers in overtime and were eliminated.

In the 2022 offseason, it was reported that Crosby played a key role in facilitating a new deal between the Penguins and Malkin, after the latter had initially announced he would test free agency. Crosby began the 2022–23 season by registering 2 goals and 4 assists in his first two games, being named the first star of the first week while leading the league in scoring. After strong initial results, the team struggled with a lengthy losing streak, but Crosby recorded his 900th career assist on November 5, 2022 in a loss to the Seattle Kraken. He was the sixth-fastest player to this feat in NHL history.

International play

Junior
Crosby debuted internationally for Canada at the 2003 U-18 Junior World Cup in the Czech Republic and Slovakia. He was the youngest player on the under-18 team, having turned 16 shortly before the beginning of the tournament. After seven consecutive gold medals at the tournament, Team Canada lost in the bronze medal game to the Czech Republic 8–2. He scored four goals and six points over five tournament games.

Crosby went on to compete in two World Junior Championships with Team Canada's under-20 team. When he was named to the team in December 2003, he became the fifth 16-year-old to represent Canada at the tournament, following Jay Bouwmeester, Jason Spezza, Eric Lindros and Wayne Gretzky. Competing in the 2004 World Junior Championships in Helsinki, he then became the youngest player to score a goal in the history of the tournament at 16 years, 4 months, and 21 days when he scored against Switzerland in a 7–2 win. This record would last until the 2012 World Juniors when Aleksander Barkov of Finland scored a goal aged 16 years, 4 months. Crosby finished the tournament with two goals and three assists in six games, helping Canada to a silver medal finish. The following year, he returned for Canada at the 2005 World Junior Championships in Grand Forks, North Dakota. He improved to six goals and three assists as Canada earned gold. Crosby stated the following year that his most memorable hockey moment was winning his World Junior gold medal.

Men's
After completing his rookie season with the Pittsburgh Penguins, Crosby competed in the 2006 IIHF World Championship as an alternate captain for Canada. Scoring a tournament-best eight goals and eight assists in nine games, he became the youngest player ever to win a World Championship scoring title. Despite his performance, Canada failed to medal, being shut-out by Finland 5–0 in the bronze medal game. Crosby was named the tournament's top forward and to the competition's all-star team.

After being omitted from Canada's Olympic team in 2006, Crosby was named to the Canadian roster on December 30, 2009 as an alternate captain for the 2010 Winter Olympics in Vancouver. He scored the game-winning shootout goal for Canada in the second game of the preliminary round against Switzerland. After going pointless in the quarter- and semi-final against Russia and Slovakia respectively, Crosby scored the winning goal 7 minutes and 40 seconds into overtime against the United States in the gold medal game. The goal has later become known as the "Golden Goal" due to it being scored in the gold medal game. It is also regarded by some as "Canada's most iconic sports moment".

Following the Penguins' second-round elimination in the 2010 playoffs, Crosby declined an invitation to join Canada midway through the 2010 IIHF World Championship in Germany. Crosby was selected to represent Canada at the 2014 Winter Olympics and was later named team captain. Canada won gold, with Crosby contributing one goal and two assists in six games. He scored his only goal in the final against Sweden, further establishing his reputation as "a player who rises up in big games". In 2015, Crosby captained Canada to its first World Championship title since 2007, with the team winning all 10 games and scoring 66 goals. Crosby, scoring four goals and seven assists in nine games, became the 26th member of the Triple Gold Club. He is the first member of the club to captain all three championship teams, and the first member to be a first overall NHL draft pick.

In 2016, Hockey Canada named Crosby captain for the 2016 World Cup of Hockey in Toronto. Crosby, who led the tournament in scoring with ten points, helped Team Canada win the championship, and was named the Most Valuable Player. He joined Bobby Orr and Wayne Gretzky as the only players to win the Conn Smythe, Hart Memorial Trophy and World Cup MVP. Team Canada head coach Mike Babcock described Crosby as a serial winner, saying, "He's that high-end competitor. He's a good leader because he tries to do it right all the time. He demands a lot out of himself. In doing so, he demands a lot out of his teammates." In 2020, he was named to the IIHF All-Time Canadian Team and the Men's All-Decade Team.

On October 3, 2021, Crosby was one of the first three players named to the men's hockey roster for Canada's team for the 2022 Winter Olympics in Beijing, alongside Connor McDavid and Alex Pietrangelo.  However, due to the NHL's subsequent decision not to attend the Beijing Games as a result of the Omicron variant's impacts on scheduling, Crosby was unable to compete. He said afterward that "I've been fortunate enough to be part of two. I definitely feel for the guys who have missed numerous opportunities."

Player profile

Style of play

As captain and first-line centre for Canada, Crosby played with different line mates in almost every game as the coaching staff struggled to find players capable of keeping pace with the superstar centre at the 2010 Winter Olympic Games in Vancouver, and again at the 2014 Winter Olympic Games in Sochi. Crosby's fellow countryman and Olympic teammate, Rick Nash, was questioned by the media about this, at one point saying, "I think he's a tough guy to keep up with. He's so fast. The way he thinks about the game seems like it's far beyond everyone else's process. It's the same thing in the last Olympics, keep shuffling around until you found something that fit." Team Canada's assistant coach in Vancouver, Ken Hitchcock, recalled, "Sid thinks at a level, when the other team has the puck, that's above everyone else in the league [NHL]. His anticipation when the other team has the puck is so high, he knows where it's going ahead of time. He can pick off passes, make you make errors. And then he also knows where people are located on the ice, so he can turn that turnover into a scoring chance."

Other professional NHL players have particularly noted Crosby for his backhand shot. For example, in his column for The Players' Tribune, Jonathan Quick of the Los Angeles Kings praised Crosby for having "the best backhand shot" in the NHL. "His blade is almost completely flat, which combined with his ridiculous forearm strength gives him the ability to go forehand to your five hole instantly or turn it over to the backhand and roof it (a lot of guys can't do this with a flat blade)."

Reputation

Noted for his on-ice vision, passing ability, leadership, work ethic and complete overall game, Crosby is considered to be one of the greatest players of all time. Bobby Orr named Crosby among the five best players in the history of NHL. Wayne Gretzky said of Crosby, "He's proven over and over that he's the best player in the game today. And it seems like the more important the game, the more impact that he makes on a game." Gordie Howe was also impressed by Crosby, "I met him and I've seen him play. Unless you put two guys on him, he'll kill you in a game." In 2016, Mario Lemieux praised his protégé for his ability to play both sides of the puck: "I think he's more of a complete player. Defensively, I think he's improved a lot over the last couple of years." In an article for The Washington Post, other players, teammates and coaches highlighted his work ethic and strive for greatness as a major factor to Crosby's lasting success. "While his natural ability – powerful skating, pistol-quick hands, uncommon feel – made him a phenom, his creative, distinct capacity for work has enabled him to stay atop the NHL." Current Pittsburgh head coach Mike Sullivan described Crosby as "best 200-foot player in the game" and the "heartbeat" of the Penguins.

On January 27, 2017, in a ceremony during the All-Star Weekend in Los Angeles, Crosby was named one of the 100 Greatest NHL Players in history. In that same year, Fox Sports ranked Crosby 15th on their "21 greatest athletes of the 21st century (so far)" list, and TSN named him the eighth-best NHL player of all-time. Four months before the 2022 Winter Olympics, Rob Rossi of The Athletic called him "arguably North America's most dominant team-sport Winter Olympian." In a survey conducted by Sportsnet in June 2017, Crosby was voted by Canadians to be the greatest athlete of the 21st century. A poll conducted by the NHLPA in 2018 of more than 500 players resulted in Crosby being voted the "most difficult to play against, best role model, best team player, the player you'd want to win one game, and the player who would be a great coach upon retirement". In 2018, Crosby was chosen as Nova Scotia's "Best athlete ever" by the Nova Scotia Sport Hall of Fame. In 2019, an anonymous survey conducted by The Athletic showed that Crosby was regarded the best all-around NHL player by his peers.

Considered a generational talent and a franchise player, drafting Crosby changed the fortunes of a struggling Pittsburgh Penguins. It helped secure funding for a new arena and ended speculation that the franchise would relocate to another city. In 2005–06, his presence helped Pittsburgh's attendance increase by 33%. Crosby's arrival also aided in reinvigorating and expanding the roots of hockey in the Pittsburgh area. Penguins CEO and president David Morehouse said, "We were in last place, we were last in revenues, we were last in attendance, our TV ratings were minimal and we were in the oldest building in the NHL... We were able to draw attention to us as a franchise because of the drafting of Sidney Crosby and the subsequent success we had."

Jerseys
Crosby's number 87 Pittsburgh Penguins jersey was the top seller on the NHL's website from September 2005 to February 2008. It has continued to be among the top-selling jerseys since his rookie season. In January 2005, an Air Canada baggage handler in Montreal stole Crosby's red Canada jersey from the World Junior Hockey Championship. It was recovered later in a mailbox. His white jersey from the tournament was temporarily delisted from an auction while the red one was missing. It eventually sold for $22,100, which went to youth hockey charities and 2004 Indian Ocean earthquake relief.

Less than a year later, one of Crosby's game-worn sweaters disappeared. The jersey he wore in his first NHL game, played against the New Jersey Devils, disappeared from his father's luggage during a flight from Pittsburgh to Buffalo. The jersey was later found at the Pittsburgh International Airport between a piece of equipment and a stairwell. Crosby's jersey from his third NHL game was the highest-selling NHL jersey in an auction for Hurricane Katrina relief – it sold for $21,010. During an online auction held by the NHL and the NHL Players Association to benefit Hockey Fights Cancer, Crosby's game-worn jersey from the first period of the 2007 All-Star Game earned the most money. Crosby's sold for $47,520, more than eight times the next highest price—$5,681 for the jersey worn by Brendan Shanahan of the New York Rangers.

Following Crosby's Olympic gold medal victory with Canada in 2010, it was announced that his stick and glove were missing. It was initially suspected that they might have been stolen; Reebok Canada offered a reward of CAD$10,000 for their return, "no questions asked". On March 10, the items were found: Crosby's stick had been placed in a shipment bound for the International Ice Hockey Federation Hall of Fame in Saint Petersburg, Russia, (the shipment was intercepted in Toronto) and his glove was found in a hockey bag belonging to Olympic teammate and Boston Bruins' centre Patrice Bergeron, whose stall was beside Crosby's in the locker room.

Personal life

Crosby rarely discusses his personal life and avoids social media. Andy O'Brien, Crosby's fitness trainer for over 15 years, has said: "He [Crosby] wants to be one of the guys and doesn't really seek to separate himself or get special treatment in any way... He takes a lot of enjoyment in the regular, simple things in life and having a normal, ordinary routine". Greg Powers described Crosby as essentially the brother of Lemieux's son Austin, as he lived with Lemieux's family in Sewickley, Pennsylvania from 2005 until 2010. In the spring of 2010, Crosby purchased his own home in the same area. In June 2006, he bought his first house on Grand Lake in Halifax, Nova Scotia.

On May 29, 2010, it was announced that Crosby would sign the richest endorsement contract in NHL history with Reebok, expected to pay Crosby $1.4 million per year for five to seven years. In 2015, he signed a six-year endorsement contract with Adidas. Crosby also has endorsement deals with Bell, Tim Hortons, and Gatorade. Regarded as one of Canada's "legendary goal-scorers and storied leaders", Crosby was featured in Canada Post's NHL Great Canadian Forwards stamp collection, alongside Phil Esposito, Guy Lafleur, Darryl Sittler, Mark Messier, and Steve Yzerman. In 2016, he won an Emmy Award for his role in There's No Place Like Home With Sidney Crosby. He also won for his participation in the Merci Sidney video that followed his return to Rimouski for his QMJHL jersey retirement ceremony.

Crosby has a younger sister named Taylor who is a hockey goaltender. Like her brother, she went to high school at Shattuck-Saint Mary's in Faribault, Minnesota to play with the school's hockey program. In 2014, Taylor joined the Northeastern Huskies women's ice hockey team as a freshman at Northeastern University in Boston. In 2015, she transferred to Minnesota's St. Cloud State University and played with the St. Cloud State Huskies women's ice hockey team through to graduation at the end of the 2017–18 school year.

Crosby continues to be active in the community in Cole Harbour, Nova Scotia. He created the Sidney Crosby Foundation in 2009, an organization committed to helping charities benefiting children. In 2015, he started a hockey school in Cole Harbour. His "Little Penguins Program" has provided free equipment and lessons to more than ten thousand local youngsters in Pittsburgh.

On November 3, 2021, Crosby tested positive for COVID-19 with "mild symptoms".

Career statistics

.

Regular season and playoffs
Bold indicates led league

 1999–2000 stats are from "Age-old question: Cole Harbour hockey association bars peewee player from bantam tourney". The Halifax Daily News. April 5, 2000.

International

Honours and achievements

Records

IIHF
 Youngest player to win a World Championship scoring title

Pittsburgh Penguins
 Assists (63) and points (102) in a season by a rookie
 Most regular-season OT goals (13)
 Most games played
 Most playoff points
 Most playoff assists
 Most playoff games
 Most points in the Stanley Cup Finals (20)
 Most playoff multi-point games

NHL
 First rookie to record 100 points and 100 penalty minutes in a season
 Youngest player to record 100 points in a season (18 years, 253 days)
 Youngest player to record 200 career points (19 years and 207 days)
 Youngest player to record 2 consecutive 100-point seasons (19 years, 215 days). 
 Youngest player voted to the starting line-up in an All-Star Game
 Youngest Art Ross Trophy and Lester B. Pearson Award winner
 Youngest player to be named to the first All-Star team
 Youngest player to lead NHL playoffs in scoring (20 years, 9 months, and 28 days)
 Youngest NHL captain to win Stanley Cup (21 years, 10 months, and 5 days)
 6th player in NHL history to win multiple Conn Smythe Trophies.
 Fewest games played by an NHL team's leading scorer (his 66 points in 41 games were the most of any player on the 2010–11 Penguins squad)

See also

 List of Pittsburgh Penguins players
 List of NHL players with 50 goal seasons
 List of NHL players with 100-point seasons
 List of NHL players with 1,000 points
 List of NHL players with 1,000 games played
 List of NHL players with 500 goals

Notes

References

Further reading

External links

 

1987 births
Art Ross Trophy winners
Canadian expatriate ice hockey players in the United States
Canadian ice hockey centres
Canadian philanthropists
Conn Smythe Trophy winners
Hart Memorial Trophy winners
Ice hockey people from Nova Scotia
Ice hockey people from Pittsburgh
Ice hockey players at the 2010 Winter Olympics
Ice hockey players at the 2014 Winter Olympics
Lester B. Pearson Award winners
Living people
Lou Marsh Trophy winners
Medalists at the 2010 Winter Olympics
Medalists at the 2014 Winter Olympics
Members of the Order of Nova Scotia
National Hockey League All-Stars
National Hockey League first-overall draft picks
National Hockey League first-round draft picks
Nova Scotia Sport Hall of Fame inductees
Officers of the Order of Canada
Olympic gold medalists for Canada
Olympic ice hockey players of Canada
Olympic medalists in ice hockey
People from Cole Harbour, Nova Scotia
People from Sewickley, Pennsylvania
Pittsburgh Penguins draft picks
Pittsburgh Penguins players
Rimouski Océanic players
Rocket Richard Trophy winners
Sportspeople from Halifax, Nova Scotia
Sportspeople from Pittsburgh
Stanley Cup champions
Triple Gold Club